Nicholas James Hillyard (born 24 February 1981) is a Scottish former first-class cricketer.

Hillyard was born at Edinburgh in February 1981, where he was educated at the Edinburgh Academy, before going up to Linacre College, Oxford. During nine years studying at Oxford, Hillyard made a single appearance in first-class cricket for Oxford University against Cambridge University in The University Match of 2006 at Oxford. Hillyard batted once in the match, scoring 79 runs from the middle order before being dismissed by Vikram Banerjee. His brother, Chris, played first-class cricket for Cambridge University.

References

External links

1981 births
Living people
Cricketers from Edinburgh
People educated at Edinburgh Academy
Alumni of Linacre College, Oxford
Scottish cricketers
Oxford University cricketers